Wiscoy may refer to:

Wiscoy Township, Winona County, Minnesota
Wiscoy Creek, a stream in New York
Wiscoy, New York, a hamlet in Hume, New York